Jagodnik may refer to the following places in Poland:
Jagodnik, Lower Silesian Voivodeship (south-west Poland)
Jagodnik, Subcarpathian Voivodeship (south-east Poland)
Jagodnik, Warmian-Masurian Voivodeship (north Poland)

See also